The 1905–06 Haverford Fords men's soccer team represented Haverford College during the 1905–06 IAFL season, and the 1905–06 ACCL season. It was the Fords fifth season of existence. The Fords entered the season as the defending ISFA National Champions and successfully defended their title.

Despite a losing record across all matches, Haverford accumulated a 3–0–1 record in the ISFA Tournament which guaranteed the Fords their national title.

Departures 

 Dickson, Aubrey 
 Morris, Charles
 Morris, Harold
 Pearson, Henry
 Pearson, Ralph 
 Priestman, A.G.
 Tatnall, A. G.

Roster 
The following players played on Haverford's roster during the 1905–06 season.

Results 

|-
!colspan=6 style="background:#c91631; color:#FFFFFF; border:2px solid #000000;"| ACCL matches
|-

|-

|-

|-
!colspan=6 style="background:#c91631; color:#FFFFFF; border:2px solid #000000;"| ISFA matches
|-

Statistics

Top goalscorers 

Haverford junior, Sigmund Spaeth, lead the Fords with eight goals throughout the season.

References

External links 
1905–06 Season Stats

Haverford
1905
1905
Haverford Fords men's soccer
Haverford Fords men's soccer